KBT or kBT may refer to:
 Kaben Airport (KBT)
 KT (energy) in physics, the product of Boltzmann constant and temperature (kBT)